Santa Fe 3415 is a preserved class 3400 4-6-2 "Pacific" type steam locomotive built in 1919 by Baldwin for the Atchison, Topeka and Santa Fe Railway. Retired in 1954, it sat in Eisenhower Park in Abilene, Kansas until 1996. At that point, it was put on display in the Abilene and Smoky Valley yard. Restoration began in 2005 and was completed in early 2009. As of 2023, No. 3415 is operational at the Abilene and Smoky Valley Railroad.

History

Service on the Santa Fe 
No. 3415 was built by the Baldwin Locomotive Works in Philadelphia, Pennsylvania in June 1919 as the sixteenth member of the Atchison, Topeka and Santa Fe Railway's fifty 3400 class locomotives. The 3400 class was designed by John Purcell, and this was also the last class of 4-6-2s bought by the Santa Fe. The class was similar to the United States Railroad Administration's (USRA) Heavy Pacifics in its tube and flue counts, but it was also fitted with a grate area similar in size to the USRA's Light Pacifics, and it was delivered with driving wheels close in size to the latter. The first forty locomotives initially burned coal, but were later converted to burn oil while being rebuilt between 1936 and 1947.

The 3400 class locomotives were initially assigned to pull top-tier heavy passenger trains at high speeds throughout divisions with moderate grades, and No. 3415, in particular, pulled such trains through the Kansas City-La Junta and Newton-Galveston divisions. On December 31, 1934, No. 3415 suffered a broken bell ringer valve while in Carrollton, Missouri, and one crew member was injured. After the Santa Fe invested in adding diesel locomotives to their roster, No. 3415 was reassigned to pull freight and mail trains throughout Kansas, Missouri, and Oklahoma, until it was retired in 1954. The Santa Fe subsequently donated the locomotive to the city of Abilene on December 9, 1955 for static display in Eisenhower Park.

Preservation 
In April 1996, the city of Abilene decided to redevelop the park, and they removed No. 3415 from its display location and donated it to the nearby Abilene and Smoky Valley Railroad, who put it on display near their depot. In 2005, the A&SVR decided to restore No. 3415 to operating condition for use on their tourist excursions. The locomotive was moved inside the A&SVR's locomotive facility, and restoration work was started by Wasatch Railroad Contractors from Cheyenne, Wyoming. After three years of work, No. 3415 was test fired on December 1, 2008, and was officially fully restored for excursion service by 2009.

The locomotive subsequently spent the next twelve years pulling tourist trains over the A&SVR's ex-Chicago, Rock Island and Pacific trackage between Abilene and Enterprise. However, it was limited to operate at fifteen miles per hour, due to the rails obtaining the lack of strength to support trains that traveled at higher speeds. After the end of the 2022 operating season, No. 3415 was taken out of service for its 1,472 inspection and rebuild, which was required by the Federal Railroad Administration (FRA). However, in February 2023, the FRA unexpectedly informed the A&SVR that they had one year left to operate No. 3415 before the inspection and rebuild had to take place. The railroad subsequently scheduled the locomotive to pull additional trains for their 2023 operating season, including some trains that will be dedicated to the railroad’s 30th anniversary in June.

Historical significance 
No. 3415 was added to the National Register of Historic Places on April 16, 2012.

References

Bibliography

External links
Steam Locomotive - ATSF 3415

3415
Baldwin locomotives
4-6-2 locomotives
Individual locomotives of the United States
Buildings and structures in Dickinson County, Kansas
Railway locomotives on the National Register of Historic Places
Railway locomotives introduced in 1919
Tourist attractions in Dickinson County, Kansas
Standard gauge locomotives of the United States
Preserved steam locomotives of Kansas